Jessica Fintzen is a German mathematician whose research concerns the representation theory of algebraic groups over the -adic numbers, with connections to the Langlands program. She is jointly appointed at the University of Cambridge, Duke University, and the University of Bonn.

Education and career
Fintzen competed for Germany in the 2008 International Mathematical Olympiad, earning a bronze medal, and earned a bachelor's degree in mathematics from Jacobs University Bremen in 2011. She went to Harvard University for graduate study in mathematics, completing her Ph.D. in 2016. Her dissertation concerned the Moy–Prasad filtration and was supervised by Benedict Gross.

After postdoctoral research at the Institute for Advanced Study, University of Michigan, and Trinity College, Cambridge, she became an assistant professor of mathematics at Duke University and was promoted to full professor there in 2022. She has also been Royal Society University Research Fellow and Lecturer at the University of Cambridge since 2020. In 2022 she became a full professor at the University of Bonn.

Recognition
Fintzen won the 2018 Friedrich Hirzebruch Dissertation prize of the German Academic Scholarship Foundation and Theodor Pfizer Foundation, and the 2018 Association for Women in Mathematics Dissertation Prize. She was named as a Sloan Research Fellow in 2021. In 2022, Fintzen won the Whitehead Prize, "for her groundbreaking work in representation theory, in particular as it relates to number theory via the (local) Langlands program".

References

External links
Home page

Year of birth missing (living people)
Living people
21st-century German mathematicians
German women mathematicians
Harvard Graduate School of Arts and Sciences alumni
Duke University faculty
Academics of the University of Cambridge
Academic staff of the University of Bonn
Jacobs University Bremen